Andrew Taylor (born 26 September 1963) is an Australian former water polo player who competed in the 1988 Summer Olympics.

References

1963 births
Living people
Australian male water polo players
Olympic water polo players of Australia
Water polo players at the 1988 Summer Olympics